Werner Aro (17 August 1873 - 24 November 1929; original surname Flink) was a Finnish tailor and politician, born in Hausjärvi. He was a member of the Parliament of Finland from 1908 to 1913, representing the Social Democratic Party of Finland (SDP). He was imprisoned from 1918 to 1920 for having sided with the Reds during the Finnish Civil War.

References

1873 births
1929 deaths
People from Hausjärvi
People from Häme Province (Grand Duchy of Finland)
Social Democratic Party of Finland politicians
Members of the Parliament of Finland (1908–09)
Members of the Parliament of Finland (1909–10)
Members of the Parliament of Finland (1910–11)
Members of the Parliament of Finland (1911–13)
People of the Finnish Civil War (Red side)
Prisoners and detainees of Finland